Prepare or variation, may refer to:

 PREPARE (Preparedness Against (Re-)emerging Epidemics) of the European Union (EU)
 Promoting Resilience and Efficiency in Preparing for Attacks and Responding to Emergencies (PREPARE) Act of 2017 (U.S.)
 Prepare (SQL), SQL workflow

See also

 
 Prep (disambiguation)
 Preparation (disambiguation)
 Preparedness (disambiguation)